Acalolepta masatakai is a species of beetle in the family Cerambycidae. It was described by Hiroshi Makihara in 2003. It is known from Japan.

References

Acalolepta
Beetles described in 2003